Qarha is a village located in the Akkar District of the Akkar Governorate in Lebanon. Its inhabitants are predominantly Alawites and Sunni Muslims.

References

Alawite communities in Lebanon
Populated places in Akkar District